SDC may refer to:
 SAARC Documentation Centre, New Delhi, India
 Sassarese language, ISO 639-3 code
 Sentosa Development Corporation, a statutory board in Singapore
 Sheffield Development Corporation, England
 Shoreditch High Street railway station, London, National Rail station code
 Societas Doctrinæ Christianæ 
 Stage Directors and Choreographers Society, US
 Sussex Downs College, England
 Sustainable Development Commission, UK
 Swiss Agency for Development and Cooperation
 Syrian Democratic Council, the legislature of Rojava
 Show Dem Camp, Nigerian rap duo
 Samsung Developer Conference

Computing and technology
 Secure Download Cabinet, an encrypted computer file format
 IEEE 11073 service-oriented device connectivity
 Smart Data Compression, a GIS data format
 Society of Dyers and Colourists
 Spirit DataCine, a motion picture film scanner
 Statistical disclosure control
 Structured Data on Commons, a project on Wikimedia Commons
 Stupid D Compiler for the D programming language
 Sydney Development Corporation, a former Canadian software company
 System Development Corporation, a computer software company